Kenmore Air Harbor Seaplane Base, or Seattle Lake Union Seaplane Base,  is a seaplane base and international airport on Lake Union, Washington, U.S.,  north of Downtown Seattle.

Facilities and aircraft 
It has one  seaplane landing area designated 16/34.

For the 12 months ending December 31, 2007, the airport had 35,500 aircraft operations, an average of 97 per day: 72% air taxi and 28% general aviation.

Airlines and destinations

Passenger

History
The first seaplane flight from Lake Union was by William E. Boeing, on June 15, 1916. The lake has been served by commercial flights from Kenmore Air since 1946. In 2018, buoys and lights were installed in the lake to warn boaters of landing planes. Despite the warnings, recreational watergoers have continued to interfere with seaplanes, leading to both cancelled flights and legal efforts to more strongly regulate water use.

References

External links 
 Kenmore Air
 Aerial photo as of 10 July 1990 from USGS The National Map
 

Airports in King County, Washington
Seaplane bases in the United States